Anadara trapezia, the Sydney cockle (NSW), or ark cockle (Queensland), is an estuarine filter-feeding bivalve.  Its calcareous, heavily ribbed shell can grow to approximately 7 to 8 cm across.  Its current range is along the east coast of Australia, from Queensland to Victoria.  It has previously existed in Western Australia, South Australia, and the coast of New Zealand during the Middle Holocene. It has been used as a bioindicator/indicator species to study levels of the metals selenium, copper and cadmium.

References
 Murray-Wallace, C.V., Beu, A.G., Kendrick, G.W., Brown, L.J., Belperio A.P. and Sherwood, J.E. (2000) Palaeoclimatic implications of the occurrence of the arcoid bivalve 'Anadara trapezia' (Deshayes) in the Quaternary of Australasia. Quaternary Science Reviews 19 559-590
 Jolley, D. F., Maher, W. A. and Kyd, J. (2004) Selenium accumulation in the cockle 'Anadara trapezia.  Environmental Pollution 132:2' 203-212

Bivalves of Australia
Bioindicators
trapezia
Bivalves described in 1840